Rogers' Rangers was a company of soldiers from the Province of New Hampshire raised by Major Robert Rogers and attached to the British Army during the Seven Years' War (French and Indian War). The unit was quickly adopted into the British army as an independent ranger company. Robert Rogers trained and commanded the rapidly deployed light infantry force, which was tasked mainly with reconnaissance as well as conducting special operations against distant targets. Their tactics were built on earlier colonial precedents and were codified for the first time by Rogers as his 28 "Rules of Ranging". The tactics proved remarkably effective, so much so that the initial company was expanded into a ranging corps of more than a dozen companies (containing as many as 1,200–1,400 men at its peak). The ranger corps became the chief scouting arm of British Crown forces by the late 1750s. The British forces in America valued Rogers' Rangers for their ability to gather intelligence about the enemy. They were disbanded in 1761.

Later, the company was revived as a Loyalist force during the American Revolutionary War. Nonetheless, a number of former ranger officers defected to fight for the Continental Army as rebel (Patriot) commanders. Some ex-rangers participated as rebel militiamen at the Battle of Concord Bridge.

The Queen's York Rangers (1st American Regiment) of the Canadian Army, formed by Rogers and Loyalist veterans of Rogers' Rangers, claims descent from Rogers' Rangers.

French and Indian War

Rogers' Rangers began in 1755 as a company in the provincial forces of the colony of New Hampshire in British North America. It was the latest in a long line of New England ranger companies dating back to the 1670s. The immediate precursor and model for the unit was Gorham's Rangers, formed in 1744. Both were initially organized by William Shirley. Gorham's Rangers are always depicted as precursors of Rogers' Rangers; however, they were also active throughout the French and Indian War, which makes them contemporaries of Rogers' Rangers. In fact, the Nova Scotia ranger corps that Gorham's company belonged to operated in cooperation with units of Rogers' corps on several occasions, most notably when Moses Hazen's company joined Rogers' Rangers at the Siege of Louisburg in 1758 and the Siege of Quebec in 1759. Rogers' company was formed to fight in the French and Indian War (the Seven Years' War in Canada, Britain, and Europe) in the borderlands of the colonial Northeast.  They were commanded by Captain (later Major) Robert Rogers and operated primarily in the Lake George and Lake Champlain regions of New York. The unit was formed during the winter of 1755 from forces stationed at Fort William Henry. The Rangers sometimes undertook raids against French towns and military emplacements, traveling on foot, in whaleboats, and even on snowshoes during winter. Israel Putnam (who would go on to later fame in the Revolutionary War) fought as a Connecticut militia captain in conjunction with Rogers, and at one point saved his life.

The usefulness of Rogers' company during 1756 and 1757 prompted the British to form a second ranger company, which was soon followed by more. By early 1758, the rangers had been expanded to a corps of fourteen companies composed of between 1,200 and 1,400 men. This included three all-Indian units, two of Stockbridge Mahicans and one of Indians from Connecticut (mainly Mohegan and Pequot). Rogers was then promoted to major and served as commandant of the Ranger Corps.

First Battle on Snowshoes 
On January 21, 1757, during the First Battle on Snowshoes, Rogers led 74 rangers to ambush the French, capturing seven prisoners near Fort Carillon at the south end of Lake Champlain. They then were attacked by about 100 French and Canadien (French Canadian) militia and their Ottawa allies from the Ohio Country. Rogers' men suffered casualties and retreated without further losses, since the French lacked snowshoes and were "floundering in snow up to their knees." Rogers' Rangers had maintained positions on the high ground and behind large trees. According to Francis Parkman, Ranger casualties were 14 killed, 6 captured, and 6 wounded, the wounded returning with 48 men who were unharmed. The French consisted of 89 Regulars and 90 Canadians and Indians; they had 37 killed and wounded. The French and Indian casualties may have included one of the captured prisoners. One wounded and captured Ranger who was later exchanged claimed to have killed one of the captured Frenchmen by striking him on the head with a tomahawk after the Rangers were ambushed. It is unclear if this was the fate of the other captured French as well.

A company of the rangers led by Noah Johnson was stationed at Fort William Henry in 1757 during the siege. The siege ended with the surrender and massacre of the British forces in August. After this, the Rangers were stationed on Rogers Island near Fort Edward. This allowed them to train and operate with more freedom than the regular forces.

Second Battle on Snowshoes 
On March 13, 1758, at the Second Battle on Snowshoes, Rogers' Rangers ambushed a French-Indian column and were then ambushed in turn by enemy forces. The Rangers lost 125 men in this encounter, as well as eight men wounded, with 52 surviving. One reference reports casualties of the Regulars, who had volunteered to accompany the Rangers, as 2 captured and 5 killed. Of Rogers' Rangers, 78 were captured and 47 killed and missing (of whom 19 were captured). Rogers estimated 100 killed and nearly 100 wounded of the French-Indian forces. The French, however, reported their casualties as just 10 Indians killed and 17 wounded, and three Canadians wounded.

The French originally reported killing Rogers in the second battle. This was based on their finding some of his belongings, including his regimental coat containing his military commission; however, he had escaped. This episode gave rise to the legend of Rogers' sliding  down the side of a mountain to the frozen surface of Lake George. There is no conclusive proof this actually happened, but the rock face is still known as "Rogers' Slide" or "Rogers Rock".

Siege of Louisbourg 
Four companies of Rogers Rangers (500 rangers) arrived on the provincial vessel King George and were at Dartmouth, Nova Scotia from April 8 until May 28, awaiting the Siege of Louisbourg (1758). While there, they scoured the woods to stop raids on the capital. During the Siege, the rangers were the first to go ashore at Freshwater Cover and encountered 100 Mi'kmaq and French soldiers.  James Wolfe and Scott followed up the rangers. The Rangers killed and scalped the Chief Mi'kmaq. In their retreat, the rangers captured 70 defenders and killed more than 50. Historian Burt Loescher describes this as "one of the most admirable feats ever performed by a detachment of the Corps."

Carillon and Crown Point 
On July 7–8, 1758, Rogers' Rangers took part in the Battle of Carillon. On July 27, 1758, between Fort Edwards and Half-Way Brook, 300 Indians and 200 French/Canadians under Captain St. Luc ambushed a British convoy. The British lost 116 killed (including 16 Rangers) and 60 captured.

On August 8, 1758, near Crown Point, New York, a British force of Rangers, light infantry, and provincials was ambushed by a French-Canadian-Indian force of 450 under Captain Marin. In this action, Major Israel Putnam was captured. He was reportedly saved from burning at the stake by the Abenaki through the intervention of a French officer and a providential thunderstorm. Francis Parkman reported 49 British fatalities and "more than a hundred" killed of the enemy. Rogers claimed the British losses were 33 and that those of the enemy as 199. Another source reports that the French casualties were four Indians and six Canadians killed, and four Indians and six Canadians wounded, including an officer and a cadet.

Raid on Saint-Francis 
During 1759, the Rangers were involved in one of their most famous operations, the St. Francis Raid. They had been ordered to destroy the Abenaki settlement of Saint-Francis in Quebec. It was the base of the raids and attacks on British settlements. Rogers led a force of 200 Rangers from Crown Point deep into French territory. Following the October 3, 1759 attack and successful destruction of Saint-Francis, Rogers' force ran out of food on their retreat through the wilderness of northern New England. They reached a safe location along the Connecticut River at the abandoned Fort Wentworth, where Rogers left them encamped. He returned a few days later with food and relief forces from Fort at Number 4 (now Charlestown, New Hampshire), the nearest British outpost.

In the raid on Saint-Francis, Rogers claimed 200 enemies had been killed, leaving 20 women and children to be taken prisoner; he took five children as captives and released the rest. The French recorded 30 deaths, including 20 women and children. According to Francis Parkman, Ranger casualties in the attack were one killed and six wounded; in the retreat, five were captured from one band of Rangers, and nearly all in another party of about 20 Rangers were killed or captured. One source alleges that only about 100 returned of about 204 Rangers, allies, and observers.

Raid on Sainte-Thérèse

In the Spring of 1760 the Rangers joined in Amherst's campaign on Montreal but before doing so conducted a successful preemptive raid on Fort Sainte Thérèse which was used to supply the French army as well as being a vital link in the communication and supply line between Fort Saint-Jean and the French forces at Île aux Noix. The settlement and fort were then burned by Rogers following which French and Indian ambushes were repelled before their return to Crown Point with only minor losses.

Montreal Campaign

Roger's Rangers were part of William Haviland's force who marched from Lake Ontario in the west along the St Lawrence River and from upper New York via the Richelieu River in August. Along the way the Rangers fought to reduce the fortified French island of Île aux Noix. During the bombardment of the island Haviland sent Rogers' four ranger companies as well as light infantry and a force of Indians to drag three cannon through the forest and swamps further down to the rear of the French position. With much difficulty this was achieved and in a few days the guns were planted on the river-bank where a French naval force stood defending it. Rogers' cannon opened up upon these vessels surprising them; the closest sloop cut her cable and a strong west wind then drove her ashore into the hands of the British. The other vessels and gunboats made all sail downstream but stranded in a bend of the river, where the rangers, swimming out with their tomahawks, boarded and took one of them, and the rest soon surrendered. With their communications cut the French evacuated the island which then fell to the British. Soon after the Forts of Saint Jean and Chambly were burned by the French; the Rangers then led the final advance on Montreal which surrendered without a fight the following month.

Pontiac's War

At the end of the war, the Rangers were given the task of taking command of Fort Detroit from the French forces.  After the war, most of the Rangers returned to civilian life. In 1763, Rogers recruited several volunteers for the reinforcement of Detroit commanded by James Dalyell of the 1st Royal Regiment and formerly of the 80th Regiment of Light Armed Foot (Gage's Light Infantry).  Upon arrival at Detroit, Dalyell talked post Commandant Henry Gladwin into allowing Dalyell to take his reinforcements to attack an Indian village near Parent's Creek.  The force of 250-300 soldiers of the 55th and 60th regiments, Rogers' volunteers, and the Queen's Royal American Rangers under the command of Captain Joseph Hopkins was ambushed, as the advanced guard made up of men from the 55th regiment crossed the bridge at Parent's Creek. Rogers' men were responsible for effectively covering the retreat of the force back to Fort Detroit.

American War of Independence

When the Revolutionary War broke out in 1775, Robert Rogers offered his services to General George Washington. However, Washington turned him down, fearing he might be a spy, since Rogers had just returned from a long stay in England. Infuriated by the rejection, Rogers offered his services to the British, who accepted. He formed the Queen's Rangers (1776) and later the King's Rangers. Rogers was instrumental in the capture of Nathan Hale in September 1776.

Several of his former rangers served under General Benedict Arnold in the revolutionary forces around Lake Champlain.

Legacy
After the conclusion of the American War of Independence, Rogers Rangers were granted tracts of land for farming in what is now Pownal, Prince Edward Island, Canada. The Rangers were reactivated during the War of 1812 and a large training camp was built there, complete with barracks, a field hospital and musket range (of which the butts can still be seen).

The Queen's York Rangers (1st American Regiment) of the Canadian Army claim to be descended from Rogers' Rangers. Also claiming descent from Rogers' Rangers are the 1st Battalion 119th Field Artillery of Michigan and the U.S. Army Rangers.

Rogers' Rangers are featured on a New Hampshire historical marker (number 56) along New Hampshire Route 10 in Haverhill.

In popular culture
 Kenneth Roberts' historical novel Northwest Passage (1937) portrays the events of Rogers' Rangers' raid on the Abenaki town of St. Francis.  The first half of the novel was adapted as the film Northwest Passage (1940), starring Spencer Tracy as Rogers.
 During the Second World War, the U.S. Army was interested in the tactics of the British Commando units.  Recalling the colonial unit, they took the name "Rangers" as the official title; these units consider Rogers their founding father and distribute copies of Rogers' Rangers Standing Orders to all aspiring Ranger students.
The film Fort Ti (1953) stars George Montgomery and Irving Bacon as Rangers rescuing hostages held in Fort Ticonderoga during the Seven Years' War.
 The film Mission of Danger portrays a Rogers' Rangers operation with actor Keith Larsen portraying Robert Rogers.
 The Methuen High School in Massachusetts uses the nickname "Rangers". The town was the birthplace of Robert Rogers.
 AMC's 2014 TV series Turn: Washington's Spies portrays Rogers' Rangers as a Loyalist militia that uses intelligence gathered from an unidentified spy inside the Continental Army to ambush its patrols. Robert Rogers remarks early in the first episode that he offered his services first to George Washington, but Washington was unwilling to pay what Rogers demanded.
 In the video game, Assassin's Creed: Rogue (2014), a Rogers' Rangers outfit dubbed the "raider outfit", complete with their signature green uniforms and a black beret with the initials "RR", is available to be unlocked by the player.

Notable rangers

 Major Robert Rogers
 Captain James Rogers
 Captain John Stark
 Joseph Cilley
 Moses Hazen
 Jonathan Moulton
 Israel Putnam
 William Stark
 Simeon Thayer
 James Hackett
 Captain Nathaniel Hutchins

See also
 Robert Rogers' 28 "Rules of Ranging"
 New Hampshire Provincial Regiment
 Sir William Johnson, 1st Baronet
 Francis Marion

Footnotes

External links
 "Gorham's and Roger's Rangers", Military Heritage
 Rogers Island Visitor Center Home Page

Military history of the Thirteen Colonies
Regiments of the British Army
Military units and formations of the French and Indian War
British American Army Rangers
Military units and formations established in 1755
Army reconnaissance units and formations